The president of Ecuador, officially called the Constitutional President of the Republic of Ecuador, serves as both the head of state and head of government of Ecuador. It is the highest political office in the country as the head of the executive branch of government. Per the current constitution, the President can serve two four-year terms. Prior to that, the president could only serve one four-year term.

The current President of Ecuador is Guillermo Lasso, who succeeded Lenín Moreno on 24 May 2021. He was elected in 2021.

History
The presidency of Ecuador has been marked by periods of instability, causing the office to change presidents frequently throughout the history of the country. At least five times, the duties of the president have been charged to a provisional government or a military junta. Often, the office has been left to an interim or acting president, many of whom would go on to become president. The president who has served the most terms in office is José María Velasco Ibarra, who served five. Before president Rafael Correa, the last president to serve out his complete term in office was Sixto Durán Ballén, who served from 1992 to 1996.

List of presidents

Latest election

See also
Politics of Ecuador
List of presidents of Ecuador
Vice President of Ecuador

References

External links
Official website of the Ecuadorian government on their presidential history 
Edufuturo's website on Presidents of Ecuador 

Presidents of Ecuador
Presidents
1830 establishments in Ecuador